Saido Bholana  is a village in Kapurthala district of Punjab State, India. The village is administrated by a Sarpanch who is an elected representative.

Transport 
Kapurthala Rail Way Station, Rail Coach Fact Rail Way Station are the very nearby railway stations however, Jalandhar City Rail Way station is 23 km away from the village. The village is 73 km away from Sri Guru Ram Dass Jee International Airport in Amritsar and the another nearest airport is Sahnewal Airport  in Ludhiana which is located 77 km away from the village.

References

External links
  Villages in Kapurthala
 Kapurthala Villages List

Villages in Kapurthala district